All Saints' Anglican Cathedral is a Canadian cathedral serving the Anglican Diocese of Edmonton, which covers central Alberta. It serves as the episcopal seat of the Bishop of Edmonton.

History
The Anglican Parish of All Saints was founded in 1875 by William Newton, the first known Anglican missionary to the Edmonton area. He arrived in Edmonton on September 28, 1875, having left Ontario in the spring. The parish first met in a log cabin at the corner of what is now Jasper Avenue and 121st Street.

By 1895 the parish had grown considerably and required a new building. A church was constructed on 103rd Street near the present site; however construction was only half completed due to lack of funds. In 1905 the church went through considerable renovations completing the original building plans. In 1914 the newly installed Bishop of Edmonton, H. A. Gray, named All Saints as the pro-cathedral of the diocese. On December 20, 1919, a fire broke out and destroyed the church leaving only the outside walls intact. The pro-cathedral was rebuilt on the same site.

The present building was completed in 1956 and was given the permanent status of cathedral. The building, dedicated on May 10, 1956. The synod offices of the diocese and those of the cathedral are located on the second floor, and seniors' residence cathedral close adjoins the cathedral via an atrium. The parish hall to the north, which predated the current cathedral, was demolished in 1973.

Clergy
The cathedral serves as the seat of the Bishop of Edmonton, which is presently vacant. 

The present dean is the Very Reverend Alex Meek, who was installed on 1 March 2020. The post of vicar is currently held by the Reverend Ruth Sesink Bott.

All Saints has one honorary assistant priests. As well, several retired clergy attend All Saints on a regular basis and do not have honorary assistant status. The lay (non-clergy) staff is rounded out with a director of music, and an executive assistant to the dean.

All Saints is host to a congregation of immigrants from South Sudan under the Rev. Akon Lual Akon and his assistant priest, the Rev. John Ayuen. The congregation of St. Mark's-Jieng celebrates services in the Dinka language rather than English.

Past staff
The following is a list of the rectors and deans of All Saints.

Rectors of All Saints

 Charles Cunningham, 1891–1893
 Alfred Studen, 1893–1896
 Henry A. Gray, 1896–1914 (Archdeacon of Edmonton in the Diocese of Calgary. Later elected 1st Bishop of Edmonton.)
 George H. Webb, 1914–1918
 E. Pierce-Goulding, 1918–1937
 T. E. Rowe, 1937–1939
 I. D. Bachelor, 1939-1940 (acting)

Deans of Edmonton and Rectors of All Saints
In 1945 the office of dean was created.

 Alick McDonald Trendell, 1940–1950
 J. Grant Sparling, 1950–1956
 Gerald Burch, 1956–1960  (later elected 5th Bishop of Edmonton 1962)
 Thomas W. Teape, 1960–1965
 Morse Goodman, 1965–1967 (afterwards Bishop of Calgary, 1968)
 Ron Shepherd, ?1968–1969 (afterwards Dean of Montreal, 1969 and then Bishop of British Columbia, 1985)
 Randal E. Ivany, 1970–1974
 James Brown, 1974–1981
 Harry Dawson, 1981–1989
 Harold T. Munn, 1989–1998
 Greg Kerr-Wilson, 1998–2006  (later 11th Bishop of Qu'Appelle and 9th Bishop of Calgary).
 Jane Alexander, 2006–2008 (later 10th Bishop of Edmonton)
 Lee Bezanson, 2008–2010
 Neil Gordon, 2010–2019
 Alexandra Meek 2020-present

References

External links

 

All Saints' Cathedral (Edmonton)
Churches in Edmonton
Anglican church buildings in Alberta
Churches completed in 1956
20th-century Anglican church buildings in Canada